Pomassl is an electronic sound and recording artist and DJ residing in Vienna, Austria, and is a co-founder of the Austrian Laton experimental techno label.

Pomassl has inspired many other analog and digital electronic artists, including members of Pansonic and Carsten Nicolai, as well as collaborated with a number of important artists across disciplines, including Carl Michael von Hausswolff, J. G. Thirlwell and Kodwo Eshun. In addition to Laton, he has released with seminal electronic labels, such as Raster-Noton, Mille Plateaux, Ash International, Sex Tags Mania, Craft, Sabotage and Nexsound.

Methods

Pomassl improvises using all manner of homebuilt analog electronic equipment, often inserting or connecting patch cables with parts of his body to introduce a deliberate and violent character of noise into dancefloor rhythms.

In addition to being notable for absurd, violent, dadaist performances that satirize the artificial interaction between player and electronic instrument, he also creates custom instrumentation to examine the edges of human-perceptible audio and uses these tools to "elaborate and process radical moments", such as aircraft blackbox data collected from crash sites.

Discography

Albums
 Skeleton (Austria: Craft/Sabotage, 1995, Craft. 07)
 Skeleton 2 (Austria: Craft/Sabotage, 1997, Craft. 19)
 Trail Error (Austria: Laton, 1997, Laton 006)
 Aircra (Austria: Laton, 1999, Laton 018)
 2001 (Austria: Laton, 2001, Laton 021)
 Retrial Error (Rmxs + Original) (Austria: Laton, 2002, Laton 011)
 Retrial Error (Rmxs) (Austria: Laton, 2002, Laton 012)
 Amalgama (Austria: Laton, Unreleased, Laton 033)
 Skeleton (Norway: Sex Tags Mania, 2007, MANIA 10)
 Spare Parts (Germany: Raster-Noton, 2007, Raster-Noton R-N088)

EPs
 Soundtrack #2 (Austria: Ego Vacuum/Sabotage, 1999, Ego 02)

Compilations
 Picknick mit Hermann! (Austria: Rhiz, 1997, Rhiz 001)
 Clicks & Cuts 3 (Germany: Mille Plateaux, 2002, MP 116 CD)
 Prototype: Armaments And Armatures Against Electronic Music (Austria: Laton, 2003, Laton 025)
 freq_out (UK: Ash International, 2003, Ash 5.8)
 MUTEK 2005 (Canada: Mutek Records, 2005)

Collaborations
 ARCHITECTRONICS (in collaboration with Kodwo Eshun) (Austria: Craft/Sabotage, 1999, Craft. 38)

Sound installations
 Ohne Titel, 2010 with Peter Kogler, Schirn Kunsthalle, Frankfurt am Main, Germany
 Dreamlands Burn (2006–2007)
 Műcsarnok / Kunsthalle Budapest, Budapest, Hungary

 Runaway (2006)
 Galéria Priestor for Contemporary Arts, Bratislava, Slovakia

 PORTAL II (2003)
 Kunsthalle Fridericianum, Kassel, Germany
 Göteborg International Biennial for Contemporary Art, Gothenburg, Sweden

 Avanto (2002)
 Muu Galleria, Helsinki, Finland

 Frequenzen Hz - Audiovisuelle Räume (2002)
 Schirn Kunsthalle, Frankfurt am Main, Germany

 10 Ans De Fri-Art - Etat des lieux #3 (2001)
 Fri-Art - Centre d'Art Contemporain, Fribourg, Switzerland

 Manifesta 2 - Luxembourg
 Manifesta - European Biennial of Contemporary Art, Amsterdam, The Netherlands

References

External links
 Laton music label
 Sabotage and Craft music labels

Austrian electronic musicians
Free improvisation
Living people
Year of birth missing (living people)